In an all-unseeded final, Louie Bickerton and Christian Boussus defeated Birdie Bond and Vernon Kirby 1–6, 6–3, 6–3, to win the mixed doubles tennis title at the 1935 Australian Championships.

Bond and Kirby won the first set with ease. The second one was interrupted by rain thrice, which got them out of their rhythm and opponents won three remaining games. In the last three games of the third set Bickerton/Boussus lost only two points.

Seeds

  Dorothy Round /  Fred Perry (quarterfinals)
  Nell Hopman /  Harry Hopman (second round)
  Nancy Lyle /  Adrian Quist (semifinals)
  Evelyn Dearman /  Enrique Maier (second round)

Draw

Finals

Earlier rounds

Section 1

Section 2

References

External links
  Source for seedings

1935 in Australian tennis
Mixed Doubles